The TGV La Poste were dedicated trainsets for high-speed freight and mail transportation by French railway company SNCF on behalf of the French postal carrier La Poste. They were withdrawn in 2015.

Services 
The trainsets were built by Alstom between 1978–1986. These TGV units are essentially  TGV Sud-Est trainsets that are modified for transporting mail. 5 half-trainsets were built, numbered 1-5. A further two, numbered 6 and 7, were converted from former TGV-SE trainset no. 38. Each half-trainset consisted of a power car and four intermediate-trailers.

In 2009, La Poste reduced services from 8 to 6 daily round trips.

On 21 March 2012 a demonstration freight train ran to London-St Pancras, but there was no follow-up.

In mid-2015, La Poste ended TGV postal services, shifting mail services to swap bodies instead as part of a major logistics restructuring and expansion which the trainsets were not capable of handling. Additionally, the demand for fast overnight mail services has been decreasing in recent years. The final service was on 27 June 2015 between Cavaillon (Marseilles) and Charolais (Paris). La Poste originally was seeking a buyer for the fleet, however in December 2016 three trainsets were dismantled by SME (Société Métallurgique d'Épernay) leaving only a half spare trainset left.

Fleet details

See also
British Rail Class 325,  postal EMUs used in Britain
ETR 500, in freight operation since October, 2018.

References

Further reading

 

Poste, La
Non-passenger multiple units
Electric multiple units with locomotive-like power cars
Postal vehicles

Alstom multiple units
1500 V DC multiple units of France
25 kV AC multiple units